Merel A de Regt (born 14 December 1981) is a Dutch former cricketer who played as a wicket-keeper. She appeared for Netherlands in three One Day Internationals, all at the 2003 IWCC Trophy in her home country. The tournament was the inaugural edition of what is now the Women's Cricket World Cup Qualifier. She scored six runs, took four catches and made two stumpings as her side won three of their five matches but failed to qualify.

References

External links
 
 

1981 births
Living people
Sportspeople from The Hague
Dutch women cricketers
Netherlands women One Day International cricketers